Ferree is a surname. Notable people with the surname include:

 De Lysle Ferree Cass (1887–1973), American writer
 A. I. Ferree (1890–1965), American politician and attorney
 Benjy Ferree, American singer/songwriter
 Jim Ferree (born 1931), American professional golfer
 Myra Marx Ferree (born 1949), American professor
 Susan Frances Nelson Ferree (1844-1919), American journalist, activist, suffragist

See also
 Ferree Covered Bridge, covered bridge located near Rushville, Rush County, Indiana, USA